Archduke Ferdinand Karl of Austria-Este (Ferdinand Karl Anton Joseph Johann Stanislaus; 1 June 1754 – 24 December 1806) was a son of Holy Roman Emperor Franz I and Maria Theresa of Austria. He was the founder of the House of Austria-Este and Governor of the Duchy of Milan between 1765 and 1796. He was also designated as the heir to the Duchy of Modena and Reggio, but he never reigned, owing to the Napoleonic Wars.

Early life

Ferdinand Karl was born on 21 June 1754 at the Schönbrunn Palace in Vienna as the fourth son and fourteenth child of the Holy Roman Emperor Franz I and his wife, Maria Theresa of Austria.

In 1763, the penultimate Este Duke of Modena, Francesco III, signed a treaty with the Empress Maria Theresa engaging the nine-year-old Ferdinand to his only son Ercole's daughter, Maria Beatrice, making him thus his heir. There had been an earlier treaty in 1753 making Ferdinand's older brother Peter Leopold the heir to the Duchy of Modena, but in 1761, Peter Leopold became heir to the Grand Duchy of Tuscany, which required a change to the Modena agreement.

In 1771, the Perpetual Imperial Diet approved the eventual investiture of Ferdinand with the imperial fiefs held by Ercole III.

Marriage and family

On 15 October 1771, Ferdinand married Maria Beatrice Ricciarda d'Este (7 April 1750–14 November 1829), only surviving child of Ercole d'Este, heir to the Duchy of Modena and Reggio (although the marriage was not a requirement of Ferdinand's eventual succession). Festivities arranged for this occasion included the operas Ascanio in Alba by Mozart and Il Ruggiero by Johann Adolph Hasse.

Ferdinand and Maria Beatrice had ten children:
Josef Franz (1772)
Maria Theresa (1773–1832); married Victor Emanuel I, King of Sardinia.
Josepha (1775–1777)
Maria Leopoldina (1776–1848); married Charles Theodore, Elector of Bavaria.
Francis IV (1779–1846); next Duke of Modena, married Princess Maria Beatrice of Savoy.
Ferdinand Karl Joseph (1781–1850); Commander-in-Chief of the Austrian army during the Napoleonic Wars.
Maximilian Joseph (1782–1863); Grand Master of the Teutonic Knights.
Maria Antonia (1784–1786)
Karl (1785 – 1809); Archbishop of Esztergom, Primate of Hungary.
Maria Ludovika (1787–1816); married her first cousin Francis I, Emperor of Austria.

Career
Ferdinand became Governor of the Duchy of Milan on his marriage in 1771, as long as his father-in-law Ercole III d'Este still ruled the Duchy of Modena. He and his family lived in Milan.

In 1780, Ferdinand was confirmed as Governor of Lombardy by his brother, the new Holy Roman Emperor Joseph II. In 1796, Napoleon's invasion of Milan forced the family to flee the French forces. Duke Ercole III also had to flee Modena, which overthrew the monarchy and joined the Cisalpine Republic.

By the Treaty of Campo Formio in 1797, Duke Ercole III was granted the Duchy of Breisgau, a Habsburg territory in southwest Germany. When Ercole III died in 1803, Ferdinand succeeded as Duke of Breisgau, as well as "titular Duke" of Modena and Reggio. By the Treaty of Pressburg in 1805, Ferdinand ceded the Duchy of Breisgau to the Grand Duchy of Baden.  

Ferdinand died the following year in Vienna, on 24 December. He is buried in the Imperial Crypt in Vienna.

In 1814, Ferdinand's eldest surviving son, Francis IV, was recognised as Duke of Modena by the Congress of Vienna.

Ancestry

References

Further reading 
 Weissensteiner, Friedrich. Die Söhne Maria Theresias. Wien: Kremayer & Scheriau, 1991.
 Wurzbach, Constantin von. "Habsburg, Ferdinand Karl Anton von Este". In Biographisches Lexikon des Kaiserthums Oesterreich. 6. Theil. Kaiserlich-königliche Hof- und Staatsdruckerei, Wien 1860, S. 204 f.

External links

 The Sixteen Children Of Maria Theresa - Eleven Daughters And Five Sons at Time Travel Vienna

1754 births
1806 deaths
18th-century Austrian people
19th-century Austrian people
Austria-Este
House of Habsburg-Lorraine
Modenese princes
Burials at the Imperial Crypt
Burials at St. Stephen's Cathedral, Vienna
Nobility from Vienna
Austrian princes
Generals of the Holy Roman Empire
Knights of the Golden Fleece of Austria
Knights Cross of the Military Order of Maria Theresa
Children of Maria Theresa
Sons of emperors
Sons of kings